Imperial Chinese missions to the Ryukyu Kingdom were diplomatic missions that were intermittently sent by the Yuan, Ming and Qing emperors to Shuri, Okinawa, in the Ryukyu Islands.   These diplomatic contacts were within the Sinocentric system of bilateral and multinational relationships in East Asia.

Some missions were sent to perform investiture ceremonies for the King of Ryukyu, formally acknowledging him as King on behalf of the Chinese Imperial Court, and as a tributary subordinate.

The envoys in Shuri
Shuri was the royal capital of the Ryukyu Kingdom. It is today part of the city of Naha, Okinawa.

Upon the accession of a new king, the news was generally communicated to the Chinese capital, along with a petition for investiture, by a formal Ryukyuan tribute mission. Following the 1609 invasion of Ryukyu, beginning with the succession of Shō Hō, the Satsuma Domain also had to be notified and asked for approval and confirmation of the new king.

Chinese envoys would then be dispatched - sometimes quite quickly, sometimes not until over a decade later - arriving in ships called  in Okinawan. The mission would usually consist of two official envoy ships, separate crafts carrying the chief envoy and his deputy, as some uncertainty accompanied the journey; these would be accompanied by a number of merchant ships. During Japan's Edo period, an agent from Satsuma known as a  would be sent down to Ryukyu to supervise the exchanges and interactions between Chinese and Ryukyuan officials, albeit from somewhat of a distance, given the policy of hiding Satsuma's involvement in Ryukyu from the Chinese.

Envoys generally stayed in Ryukyu for four to eight months, and were extensively entertained by the Ryukyuan royal court. A number of structures built for this purpose, including the Ryūtan pond and the Hokuden (North Hall) of Shuri Castle, can still be seen today on the castle grounds. The total Chinese entourage generally numbered between 300 and 800 people, and hosting and entertaining the Chinese envoys was an extremely expensive endeavor for the Ryukyuan court.

A "" oversaw these entertainments; kumi odori, a traditional form of Ryukyuan dance-drama, was first created and performed for entertaining an investiture envoy and his fellows, in 1719.

Timeline of missions
King Satto became, in 1372, the first Ryukyuan king to submit to Chinese suzerainty. Beginning with the investiture of Satto's successor, Bunei, in 1404, twenty-two such missions traveled to Ryukyu in total, the last in 1866, for the investiture of Shō Tai.

In the late 19th century, the Sinocentric tributary state system was superseded by the Westphalian multi-state system.

See also
 Ryukyuan missions to Edo
 Ryukyuan missions to Imperial China
 Foreign relations of Imperial China
 Ryukyuan missions to Joseon
 Joseon missions to the Ryukyu Kingdom
 Kōchi Chōjō
 Rin Seikō

Notes

References
 Goodrich, Luther Carrington and Zhaoying Fang. (1976).  Dictionary of Ming biography, 1368-1644 (明代名人傳), Vol. I;  Dictionary of Ming biography, 1368-1644 (明代名人傳), Vol. II. New York: Columbia University Press. ; ;  OCLC 1622199
 Kang, David C. (2010). East Asia Before the West: Five Centuries of Trade and Tribute. New York : Columbia University Press.  / ;  OCLC 562768984
 Kerr, George H. (1965). Okinawa, the History of an Island People. Rutland, Vermont: C.E. Tuttle Co. OCLC 39242121
 Nussbaum, Louis-Frédéric. (2002).  Japan Encyclopedia. Cambridge: Harvard University Press. ; OCLC 48943301
 Suganuma, Unryu. (2000). Sovereign Rights and Territorial Space in Sino-Japanese Relations: Irredentism and the Diaoyu/Senkaku Islands. Honolulu: University of Hawaii Press.  ;  OCLC 170955369
 Chūzan Seifu (:ja:中山世譜)

Further reading
 Mizuno, Norihito. (2003). China in Tokugawa Foreign Relations: The Tokugawa Bakufu’s Perception of and Attitudes toward Ming-Qing China, p. 109. excerpt from Japan and Its East Asian Neighbors: Japan's Perception of China and Korea and the Making of Foreign Policy from the Seventeenth to the Nineteenth Century, Ph.D. dissertation, Ohio State University, 2004, as cited in Tsutsui, William M. (2009).  A Companion to Japanese History, p. 83.
 Toby, Ronald P. (1991).  State and Diplomacy in Early Modern Japan: Asia in the Development of the Tokugawa Bakufu. Stanford: Stanford University Press. 
 Yoda, Yoshiie. (1996). The Foundations of Japan's Modernization: a comparison with China's Path towards Modernization. Leiden: Brill. ;  OCLC 246732011

 
Foreign relations of the Ryukyu Kingdom
Foreign relations of the Ming dynasty
Foreign relations of the Qing dynasty
China history-related lists
China diplomacy-related lists